This is a list of past and present members of the Senate of Canada representing the province of Nova Scotia.

During the Quebec Conference of 1864, Nova Scotia was guaranteed ten Senate seats, but because Prince Edward Island stalled for equal representation in the upper house, Nova Scotia was awarded two of Prince Edward Island's Senate seats, until 1873 when Prince Edward Island gave in and joined confederation Nova Scotia dropped to 10 seats. The province kept its extra seats until the first two senators ended their term after 1873, they were not replaced.

Current senators

Notes:

1 Senators are appointed to represent Nova Scotia. Each senator may choose to designate a geographic area within the province as his or her division.
2 Senators are appointed by the Governor-General of Canada on the recommendation of the prime minister.
3 Division designated as Chester from 1996 to 1999 and as Stanhope St. / South Shore since 1999.

Historical

Notes:

1 Senators are appointed to represent Nova Scotia. Each senator may choose to designate a geographic area within Nova Scotia as his or her division.
2 Senators are appointed by the Governor-General of Canada on the recommendation of the prime minister. Senators appointed by royal proclamation were appointed at the Senate's founding directly by Queen Victoria.

Maritimes regional senators
Senators listed were appointed to represent the Maritimes under section 26 of the Constitution Act. This clause has only been used once before to appoint two extra senators to represent four regional Senate divisions: Ontario, Quebec, the Maritimes and the Western Provinces.

As vacancies open up among the normal members of the Senate, they are automatically filled by the regional senators. Regional senators may also designate themselves to a senate division in any province of their choosing in their region.

Notes:

1 Party listed was the last party of which the senator was a member.
2 Senators are appointed to represent their region. Each senator may choose to designate a geographic area within their region as his or her division.
3 Senators are appointed by the Governor-General of Canada on the recommendation of the prime minister.

See also
Lists of Canadian senators

External links
Current Senators List Parliament Website
A Legislative and Historical Overview of the Senate

Nova Scotia
Senators
Senators